Tiffany Lott-Hogan (born August 1, 1975) is an Olympic athlete representing the United States, competing in the heptathlon.

Lott-Hogan won the gold medal in the heptathlon at the 2003 Pan American Games, and won the NCAA championship in the event in 1997 and 1998 while attending Brigham Young University. She qualified for the 2004 Summer Olympics, and finished 20th in the heptathlon.

Stats
 Weight: 139 lbs (63 kg) 
 Height: 5 ft 7.5 in (172 cm)

References

 

1975 births
Brigham Young University alumni
People from Pleasant Grove, Utah
Track and field athletes from Utah
American heptathletes
Living people
Athletes (track and field) at the 2003 Pan American Games
Athletes (track and field) at the 2004 Summer Olympics
Olympic track and field athletes of the United States
Pan American Games gold medalists for the United States
Pan American Games medalists in athletics (track and field)
Universiade medalists in athletics (track and field)
Universiade gold medalists for the United States
Medalists at the 1999 Summer Universiade
Medalists at the 2003 Pan American Games